Telephone numbers in Cuba all have the same format, consisting of the country code (53), followed by an area code.

Phone numbers in Cuba have up to eight digits. The first one to two are the area code, the remaining digits are the subscriber number.

Calls between different area codes are prefixed with the trunk prefix 0, followed by the area code.

The international call prefix is 00. 

(https://it.granma.cu/cuba/2019-04-26/etecsa-installera-il-codice-daccesso-00)

The mobile numbers format is 5xxx xxxx.

List of area codes in Cuba

The Guantanamo Bay Naval Base, operated by the United States Navy, has an unofficial area code of 99, which is only dialable from within the United States. Dialing 011 53 99 returns a second dial tone, after which the local number at the naval base can be dialed.

See also
Communications in Cuba

References

External links 
 Empresa de Telecomunicaciones de Cuba, SA - ETECSA website
 Cubacel (Mobile phones administration) Cubacel website
 CubaSMS (Text messages to cuban mobile phones) CubaSMS website

Cuba
Telecommunications in Cuba
Cuba communications-related lists